Igreja do Convento do Louriçal is a church in Portugal. It is classified as a National Monument.

Churches in Leiria District
National monuments in Leiria District